Ohoma Harida is a 2004 Sri Lankan Sinhala comedy film directed by Sunil Soma Peiris and produced by Sunil T Fernando for Sunil T Films. It stars Tennyson Cooray and Dilhani Ekanayake in lead roles along with Arjuna Kamalanath and Rex Kodippili. It is the 1037th Sri Lankan film in the Sinhala cinema.

Plot

Cast
 Tennyson Cooray as Sathyapala
 Arjuna Kamalanath as Mithrapala
 Mohan Hettiarachchi as Vasantha 'Driver'
 Rex Kodippili as Gajasinghe Mudalali
 Dilhani Ekanayake as Namali
 Vijaya Nandasiri as Namali's Father
 Sunil Hettiarachchi as Weerasinghe 'Mudalali'
 Anusha Damayanthi as Thushari
 Susila Kottage as Namali's Mother
 Upali Keerthisena as Kappuwa
 Rajitha Hiran as Vadda
 Kapila Sigera as Samson
 Samanthi Lanerolle as Weerasinghe Mudalali's wife
 Kusala Perera as Kumari

References

2004 films
2000s Sinhala-language films
2004 comedy films
Sri Lankan comedy films